The Wang Institute of Graduate Studies was an independent educational institution founded in 1979 by computer entrepreneur An Wang.  Its purpose was to provide professional and continuing studies in the nascent field of software engineering.  It was accredited by the New England Association of Schools and Colleges in 1983.  Faculty members were recruited from industry and students were required to have a minimum of three years prior experience in industry as a condition of acceptance.

The Institute acquired its  campus from the Marist Brothers who had operated a seminary on the site since 1924.  Located in Tyngsborough, Massachusetts, it housed two divisions:  The School of Information Technology and a fellowship program in East Asian studies.

The Institute never grew beyond a dozen or so faculty. As a result of declining business fortunes Dr. Wang closed the Institute, graduating the last class on August 27, 1988.McKeeman, William, "Graduation Talk at Wang Institute," Computer, vol. 22, no. 5, pp. 78-80 (1989)  The campus was transferred to Boston University where it served as a corporate education center. Today, it is the location of the Innovation Academy Charter School.

Software engineering curriculum
The Institute graduated seven classes between 1982 and 1988 in its Master of Software Engineering program, requiring study in eleven three-credit courses.  Two project courses involved students in team-based analysis, specification, design, implementation, testing, and integration of software products.Fairley, Richard and Martin, Nancy.  "Software engineering programs at the Wang Institute of Graduate Studies," Proceedings of the 1983 annual conference on Computers (1983)

The original six core courses were:

The curriculum was later modified to include an optional operating systems course instead of the architecture course.Ardis, Mark.  "The Evolution of Wang Institute's Master of Software Engineering Program," IEEE Transactions on Software Engineering 13(11), 1149-1155, November (1987).

Elective courses covered a wide spectrum of computer science and management topics, including: compiler construction, database management systems, decision support systems, expert system technology, principles of computer networks, programming environments, requirements analysis, software marketing, technical communication, transaction processing systems, user interface design, and validation and verification.

Notes

Defunct private universities and colleges in Massachusetts
Educational institutions established in 1979
Software engineering organizations
Educational institutions disestablished in 1988
1979 establishments in Massachusetts